Thomas Hodgson may refer to:

 Tom Hodgson (1924–2006), Canadian sprint canoer and artist
 Thomas Hodgson (priest) (1854–1921), priest of the Church of England
 Thomas M. Hodgson, American law enforcement agent and politician
 Thomas Vere Hodgson (1864–1926), British polar explorer and marine biologist